"Ring A Ling" is a song by London rapper Sneakbo. Ring A Ling samples the chorus from Shabba Ranks "Ting A Ling". "Ring A Ling" was also playlisted on Radio 1 A list. The song entered the UK Singles Chart at number 27. The song was written by Rexton Rawlston Fernando Gordon, Agassi Odusina, James Grant, Darius Ellington and produced by ILL BLU.

Music video
A music video to accompany the release of "Ring A Ling" was first released onto YouTube on 30 May 2013 at a total length of three minutes and twenty six seconds.

Track listing

Chart performance

Weekly charts

Release history

References

Sneakbo songs
2013 singles